Marco Aurélio Ribeiro Barbieri simply Marco Aurélio (born 27 March 1983 in São Paulo) is a Brazilian footballer who plays as a left back.

Aurélio has previously played in the Greek Super League for Aris and Panserraikos.

References

1983 births
Living people
Brazilian footballers
Brazilian expatriate footballers
Sport Club Corinthians Paulista players
União São João Esporte Clube players
Aris Thessaloniki F.C. players
Panserraikos F.C. players
Associação Portuguesa de Desportos players
Rio Claro Futebol Clube players
Veria F.C. players
Olympiakos Nicosia players
Ethnikos Achna FC players
Aris Limassol FC players
Nea Salamis Famagusta FC players
AEZ Zakakiou players
Campeonato Brasileiro Série A players
Super League Greece players
Cypriot First Division players
Expatriate footballers in Greece
Expatriate footballers in Cyprus
Brazilian expatriate sportspeople in Cyprus
Association football defenders
Footballers from São Paulo